Qingshen County is a county of Sichuan Province, China. It is under the administration of the prefecture-level city of Meishan.

Climate

References

County-level divisions of Sichuan